Music Again may refer to:

 "Music Again", a 2009 song by Adam Lambert from For Your Entertainment
 "Music Again", a 2021 song by Saint Etienne from I've Been Trying to Tell You